Muhammad Ramzan (born 11 December 1933) is a Pakistani former swimmer. He competed in two events at the 1952 Summer Olympics.

References

1933 births
Living people
Pakistani male swimmers
Olympic swimmers of Pakistan
Swimmers at the 1952 Summer Olympics
Place of birth missing (living people)